Foley v Hill (1848) 2 HLC 28, 9 ER 1002 is a judicial decision of the House of Lords in relation to the fundamental nature of a bank account.  Together with Joachimson v Swiss Bank Corporation [1921] 3 KB 110 it forms part of the foundational cases relating to English banking law and the nature of a bank's relationship with its customer in relation to the account.

The case decided that a banker does not hold the sums in a bank account on trust for its customer.  Instead the relationship between them is that of debtor and creditor.  When the customer deposits money in the account it becomes the bank's money, and the bank's obligation to repay an equivalent sum (and any agreed interest) to the customer or the customer's order.

The decision was crucial to the modern evolution of banking.  Had the appellant's argument that the bank should be treated as a trustee succeeded then a bank would not be entitled to use the sums deposited with it for lending to other parties because of the rule against trustee's making a profit out of the trust property.

Facts

Edward Thomas Foley and Sir Edward Scott (who was not a party to the action) were owners of collieries in Staffordshire.  They had jointly opened an account with the defendant bank.  In April 1829 £6,117 10s was transferred from that joint account to a separate account in the sole name of Foley.  The bank sent a letter enclosing the receipt and agreeing to pay 3 per cent interest on the sum.  From 1829 until 1834, when the joint account was closed, Foley's share of the profits of the collieries was paid by cheques drawn on the joint account by the agents managing the collieries.  These cheques were paid in cash or by bills drawn by them on their London bankers in favour of Foley, and none of them were paid into his separate account.  The only amount ever credited to that account was the initial £6,117 10s together with interest calculated by the bank up to 25 December 1831, but not afterwards.

Foley filed a bill in equity in January 1838 against the banking, claiming that an account should be taken of not only the initial deposit but also all other sums received by the bank for Foley on his private account since April 1829, with interest on the same at the rate of 3 per cent per annum; and also an account of all sums properly paid by them for or to the use of Foley on his said account since that day.

The defendant banks pleaded a defence based upon the Statute of Limitations.

Judgment

The case came initially before the Vice-Chancellor, Sir James Wigram, who ordered an account.  That decision was appealed to the Lord Chancellor, Lord Lyndhurst, who reversed the decision.  The matter was then appealed to the House of Lords where, unusually, Lord Lyndhurst sat on the appeal against his own decision (although by this time he had been replaced by Lord Cottenham as Lord Chancellor).  After hearing counsel for the appellant Foley, their Lordships told counsel for the bank that they did not need to address them and promptly dismissed the appeal.

House of Lords
The House of Lords held that because there was no equitable relationship the defence based upon limitation periods succeeded. Giving the main judgment, the Lord Cottenham LC said the following.

Lord Brougham, Lord Campbell and Lord Lyndhurst gave concurring opinions.

Significance
The decision has been applied many times since, and has never been seriously questioned. Although various earlier cases had also applied the principle that the relationship between banker and customer was one of debtor and creditor, this was the first time that the House of Lords, as the highest court in the land, had affirmed the position.

Notes

English banking case law
House of Lords cases
1848 in case law
1848 in British law